This lists of mines is a meta-list (list of lists) containing links to mine-related lists.

By production
List of coal mines
List of coal mines in Australia
List of collieries in Newcastle (Australia)
List of coal mines in Queensland
List of coal mines in Canada
List of coal mines and landmarks in the Nanaimo area
List of coal mines in Japan
List of coal mines in the United Kingdom
List of collieries in Yorkshire (1984–2015)
List of coal mines in the United States
List of copper mines
List of copper mines in Canada
List of copper mines in the United States
List of diamond mines
List of gold mines
List of gold mines in Australia
List of active gold mines in Western Australia
List of gold mines in Canada
List of gold mines in Japan
List of largest gold mines by production
List of gold mines in Tanzania
List of gold mines in the United States
List of active gold mines in Nevada
List of gold mines in Georgia
List of iron mines
List of iron mines in the United States
List of iron ore mines in Australia
List of molybdenum mines
List of nickel mines
List of nickel mines in Canada
List of silver mines
List of uranium mines

By location

Africa
List of mines in Africa
List of mines in Algeria
List of mines in Angola
List of mines in Botswana
List of mines in Burkina Faso
List of mines in Cameroon
List of mines in Egypt
List of mines in South Africa
List of mines in Tanzania
List of gold mines in Tanzania

North America

Canada
 Lists of mines in Canada
List of coal mines in Canada
List of gold mines in Canada
List of nickel mines in Canada
List of mines in Alberta
List of mines in British Columbia
List of mines in Manitoba
List of mines in New Brunswick
List of mines in Newfoundland and Labrador
List of mines in the Northwest Territories
List of mines in Nova Scotia
List of mines in Nunavut
List of mines in Ontario
List of mines in Temagami
List of mines in Prince Edward Island
List of mines in Quebec
List of mines in Saskatchewan
List of mines in Yukon

Mexico
List of mines in Mexico

United States
Lists of mines in the United States
List of coal mines in the United States
List of copper mines in the United States
List of iron mines in the United States
List of gold mines in the United States
List of active gold mines in Nevada
List of gold mines in Georgia
List of mines in California
List of mines in Michigan
List of mines in Oregon

Oceania
List of mines in Australia
List of coal mines in Australia
List of collieries in Newcastle (Australia)
List of coal mines in Queensland
List of gold mines in Australia
List of active gold mines in Western Australia
List of iron ore mines in Australia

South America
List of mines in Bolivia
List of mines in Chile
List of mines in Peru
List of mines in Brazil

Europe
List of mines in Belgium
List of mines in Bulgaria
List of mines in Denmark
List of mines in Estonia
List of mines in Germany
List of mines in Greece
List of mines in Ireland
List of mines in Kosovo
List of mines in Norway
List of mines in Poland
List of mines in Portugal
List of mines in Romania
List of mines in Russia
List of mines in Serbia
List of mines in Ukraine
List of mines in the United Kingdom
List of coal mines in the United Kingdom
List of collieries in Yorkshire (1984–2015)

Asia
List of mines in Afghanistan
List of mines in China
List of mines in India
List of mines in Indonesia
List of mines in Japan
List of coal mines in Japan
List of gold mines in Japan
List of mines in Korea
List of mines in Kyrgyzstan
List of mines in Mongolia
List of mines in Pakistan
List of mines in the Philippines

Other
List of deepest mines
List of open-pit mines
List of show mines
List of lost mines

See also
Lists of countries by mineral production